Erythrophysa is a genus of plant in the family Sapindaceae. It contains the following species (but this list may be incomplete):
 Erythrophysa alata (Eckl. & Zeyh.) Hutch.
 Erythrophysa belini
 Erythrophysa sakalava Capuron
 Erythrophysa septentrionalis Verdc.
 Erythrophysa transvaalensis I.Verd.

 
Taxonomy articles created by Polbot
Sapindaceae genera